The Darklight Film Festival is an event that occurs annually in Dublin and Belfast. The festival takes place over a weekend and screens independent and artist film as well as different forms of technology that can further expand this industry. Art exhibitions, seminars and workshops also take place over the weekend. The festival's website describes it as "Ireland's premier festival celebrating independent, DIY and artist films." The festival was first held in 1999.

The Darklight's mission is “to nurture new talent and to create new possibilities for the imagination.”

The festival is sponsored primarily by the Arts Council, Dublin City Council, the Irish Film Board, Fas, Culture Ireland and Waterways Ireland.

The Aims Of The Darklight Festival are to;

 To exhibit work that pushes the boundaries of concepts, visual aesthetic, narrative, access, methods of production and dialogue through contemporary filmmaking techniques and display creative excellence.
 To nurture new talent and to create new possibilities for the imagination.
 To encourage the contribution of local Irish filmmakers while also featuring international work.
 To inspire and stimulate by juxtaposing celebrated commercial creations with highly expressive artistic projects.
 To create opportunities for artists and filmmakers working with new technologies to show their work and share their ideas.
 To bring new and exciting work to Irish audiences through cinema, exhibition and performance and to an international audience via the Internet and Touring Programme

References

External links 
 http://www.state.ie/35036-news/darklight-film-festival-a-state-preview Darklight Film Festival – A State preview, December 8, 2011
 https://web.archive.org/web/20120223231426/http://totallydublin.ie/film-feature--66.html
 https://web.archive.org/web/20111001004304/http://www.movies.ie/Articles/Darklight_Festival_2011_programme_revealed
 http://twotube.ie/2011/10/darklight-film-festival-2011/

Film festivals in Ireland